Armagh or County Armagh was a parliamentary constituency in the House of Commons. It was replaced in boundary changes in 1983.

The Act of Union 1800 provided for the Parliament of Ireland to be merged with the Parliament of Great Britain, to form the Parliament of the United Kingdom. The 300 seats in the Irish House of Commons were reduced to 100 Irish members in the United Kingdom House of Commons. The thirty-two Irish counties retained two seats in Parliament.

Members of Parliament

Politics and history of the constituency
The union took effect on 1 January 1801. There was no new election for the members of the 1st Parliament of the United Kingdom, as the House of Commons was composed of members elected to the previous Parliaments of Ireland and Great Britain.  The constituencies consisted of the whole of County Armagh, excluding the part in the Parliamentary borough constituency of Armagh City.

Catholics were excluded from taking Irish seats in Parliament from 1691 until 1829. See Catholic emancipation for further details.

Catholics, who were otherwise qualified to vote, had to take various oaths before doing so; under Acts of 1691 and 1703. An Act of 1727 prohibited "papists" from voting at all. They were not again permitted to qualify to vote until 1793.

Before 1885 there was a restrictive property based franchise. In 1829 the traditional county 40 shilling freehold landowning qualification was changed to a £10 qualification (which was an increase to five times the previous level). It was not until the householder franchise was introduced for county elections, in the electoral reforms which took effect in 1885, that most (but not all) adult males became voters.

In these circumstances most members of parliament came from a limited number of Protestant aristocratic and gentry families. There were few contested elections.

In the first half century or so after the union this constituency was fairly evenly balanced between Whig/Liberal and Tory/Conservative parties. Thereafter the area became more Conservative.

The constituency was represented by two MPs from 1801 until 1885, and by one MP from 1922 until 1983.  In 1885, it was split into Mid Armagh, North Armagh and South Armagh.

A new seat was created in 1922 when as part of the establishment of the devolved Stormont Parliament for Northern Ireland, the number of MPs in the Westminster Parliament was drastically cut. The seat consisted of the entirety of County Armagh. In 1983 most of it became part of the Newry and Armagh constituency, with part going to Upper Bann.

From its inception Armagh had a unionist majority, though by the 1970s the nationalist vote was in the mid 30s%.

In 1951, it was one of the last four seats to be uncontested in a UK general election, and in 1954 it saw the last uncontested by-election in the UK.

In 1974 the Ulster Unionist Party repudiated the Sunningdale Agreement and so did not reselect the pro Sunningdale MP, John Maginnis. Instead they ran Harold McCusker, who held the seat until 1983. He was then elected for Upper Bann, which contained part of Armagh.

For the history of the area post 1983, please see Newry and Armagh and Upper Bann.

Elections
In two-member elections the bloc voting system was used. Voters could cast a vote for one or two candidates, as they chose. The two candidates with the largest number of votes were elected.

In by-elections, to fill a single seat, the first past the post system applied.

There was no election in 1801. The representatives of the county in the former Parliament of Ireland became members of the 1st Parliament of the United Kingdom.

After 1832, when registration of voters was introduced, a turnout figure is given for contested elections. In two-member elections, when the exact number of participating voters is unknown, this is calculated by dividing the number of votes by two. To the extent that voters did not use both their votes this will be an underestimate of turnout. If the electorate figure is unknown the last known electorate figure is used to provide an estimate of turnout.

Where a party had more than one candidate in one or both of a pair of successive elections change is calculated for each individual candidate, otherwise change is based on the party vote.

Elections in the 19th century
Archibald Acheson and Robert Camden Cope were co-opted as non-partisans in 1801.
At the 1802 and 1806 general elections, Archibald Acheson and Henry Caulfeild were elected unopposed.
At the 1807 Armagh by-election, Brownlow was elected unopposed.
At the 1807 general election, Richardson and Brownlow were elected unopposed.
At the 1812 general election, Richardson and William Brownlow were elected unopposed.
At the 1815 Armagh by-election, Henry Caulfeild was elected unopposed.

Elections in the 1810s

Elections in the 1820s
At the 1820 general election, Charles Brownlow and Henry Caulfeild were elected unopposed.

Elections in the 1830s

Elections in the 1840s

Elections in the 1850s

Elections in the 1860s

 Caused by Close's resignation.

Elections in the 1870s

 Caused by Verner's death.

Elections in the 1880s

Elections in the 1920s

Elections in the 1930s

Elections in the 1940s

Elections in the 1950s

Elections in the 1960s

Elections in the 1970s

References

 The Parliaments of England by Henry Stooks Smith (1st edition published in three volumes 1844–50), second edition edited (in one volume) by F.W.S. Craig (Political Reference Publications 1973)
 
 Who's Who of British members of parliament: Volume I 1832–1885, edited by M. Stenton (The Harvester Press 1976)
 Northern Ireland Parliamentary Election Results 1921–1972, compiled and edited by Sydney Elliott (Political Reference Publications 1973)

External links
 http://www.oireachtas.ie/members-hist/default.asp?housetype=0
 http://historical-debates.oireachtas.ie/en.toc.dail.html 
 http://www.irishstatutebook.ie/1923/en/act/pub/0012/index.html
 For the exact definition of Northern Ireland Parliament constituency boundaries see http://www.election.demon.co.uk/stormont/boundaries.html

Dáil constituencies in Northern Ireland (historic)
Constituencies of the Parliament of the United Kingdom established in 1801
Constituencies of the Parliament of the United Kingdom disestablished in 1885
Constituencies of the Parliament of the United Kingdom established in 1922
Constituencies of the Parliament of the United Kingdom disestablished in 1983
Westminster constituencies in County Armagh (historic)
1801 establishments in Ireland
1885 establishments in Ireland
1922 establishments in Northern Ireland
1983 disestablishments in Northern Ireland